Joakim Daniel Askling (born 4 January 1990) is a Swedish footballer. Besides Sweden, he has played in Italy and Israel.

Honours
Liga Alef
Winner (1): 2013–14

References

External links
 

1990 births
Living people
Swedish Jews
Swedish footballers
Jewish footballers
Djurgårdens IF Fotboll players
U.C. AlbinoLeffe players
Hapoel Kfar Saba F.C. players
Hapoel Be'er Sheva F.C. players
Beitar Tel Aviv Bat Yam F.C. players
Beitar Jerusalem F.C. players
Assyriska FF players
Israeli Premier League players
Liga Leumit players
Footballers from Stockholm
Enskede IK players
Swedish people of Jewish descent
Swedish people of Israeli descent
Association football defenders